Samuel Cruz Garza (born October 17, 1989) is an American soccer player for Denton Diablos FC in the National Premier Soccer League.

Early life and education 
Garza was born on October 17, 1989, in Carrollton, Texas.  After his father's job moved him to New Mexico, he returned to Highland Village, Texas, to attend Edward S. Marcus High School and play on the school's varsity soccer team from 2005 to 2008.  Garza would win back-to-back Texas Class 5A State titles with the team and was named as the 2008 Texas Gatorade Player of the Year and a NSCAA All-American.

Garza attended the University of Denver and played college soccer for the Denver Pioneers men's soccer team.  He made 20 appearances for the Pioneers and scored 4 goals before tearing his ACL and meniscus early in his sophomore year.

Garza transferred to the University of California, Santa Barbara, joining up with the UC Santa Barbara Gauchos men's soccer team ahead of the 2010 season.  He was the first United States U20 team player to join the Gauchos.  In his two years at UCSB, Garza made 44 appearances, scoring 17 goals and assisting on 10 others.

Club career

San Jose Earthquakes 
Following his junior year, Garza was signed by Major League Soccer to a Generation Adidas contract and forwent playing his senior season at UCSB.  He was drafted in the first round, sixth overall, by San Jose Earthquakes in the 2012 MLS SuperDraft, two spots behind Gaucho teammate Luis Silva.

San Antonio and Arizona 
In February 2014, San Jose sent Garza on loan to North American Soccer League side San Antonio Scorpions.  Garza, on his loan to San Antonio, has stated "When I got loaned to San Antonio Scorpions, it was one of the worst times of my life. I was not enjoying my football."  He would make 2 appearances in total for the club before San Jose waived him in July 2014.

Garza joined USL PRO side Arizona United SC for the remainder of the 2014 season.  He appeared in 9 games, scoring once.  While playing for Arizona United, he caught the attention of Ezra Hendrickson and a conversation with Sigi Schmid ensued, leading Garza to Seattle.  At the conclusion of the season, Garza returned home to Texas and set forth a career in coaching and teaching at Marcus High School, becoming the school’s varsity head coach in 2019.

Seattle Sounders FC 2 
Following his conversations at the end of the prior season, Garza went on trial with Seattle Sounders FC 2 of the United Soccer League in February 2015.  His trial was successful and he signed with the club in March 2015.  He appeared in 23 games, adding 4 goals and 2 assists, but he was not retained for the following season.

Return to Arizona 
Garza was re-signed by Arizona United in February 2016 for the 2016 USL season.  In November 2016, Garza was named as the head coach for the Marcus Marauders Football Club (MMFC), the Boys Soccer team at his alma mater Edward S. Marcus High School, in Flower Mound, Texas.

International career 
Garza was a member of the United States men's national under-20 soccer team from 2008 to 2009.  His first game was December 20, 2008, against Haiti U20 and he scored his first U20 goal against the Canada U20 team just days later on December 22.  He later represented his country at the 2009 CONCACAF U-20 Championship.  Garza was named to the U-20 team by Thomas Rongen for the 2009 FIFA U-20 World Cup, but had to be replaced due to his knee injury suffered with Denver Pioneers.  He made a total of 7 appearances with 1 goal for the U20 side.

References

External links 

 Arizona United SC player profile
 NASL player profile
 
 San Jose Earthquakes profile
 UC Santa Barbara profile
 United States U20 profile
 

1989 births
Living people
American soccer players
Denver Pioneers men's soccer players
UC Santa Barbara Gauchos men's soccer players
San Jose Earthquakes players
San Antonio Scorpions players
Phoenix Rising FC players
Tacoma Defiance players
Association football forwards
Soccer players from Texas
Sportspeople from the Dallas–Fort Worth metroplex
People from Carrollton, Texas
San Jose Earthquakes draft picks
Major League Soccer players
North American Soccer League players
USL Championship players
United States men's under-20 international soccer players